Kathy Jordan and Betsy Nagelsen were the defending champions but only Nagelsen competed that year with Elizabeth Smylie.

Nagelsen and Smylie lost in the quarterfinals to Lea Antonoplis and Barbara Gerken.

Gigi Fernández and Betsy Nagelsen won in the final 6–1, 6–4 against Antonoplis and Gerken.

Seeds
Champion seeds are indicated in bold text while text in italics indicates the round in which those seeds were eliminated.

 Betsy Nagelsen /  Elizabeth Smylie (quarterfinals)
 Gigi Fernández /  Robin White (champions)
 Leila Meskhi /  Svetlana Parkhomenko (semifinals)
 Larisa Savchenko /  Natasha Zvereva (semifinals)

Draw

References
 1988 Suntory Japan Open Tennis Championships Women's Doubles Draw

Doubles